is a platform video game developed and published by Nintendo for the Nintendo DS. It was first released in May 2006 in North America and Japan, and in PAL regions on June 2006. It is the first installment in the New Super Mario Bros. subseries of the Super Mario franchise, and follows Mario as he fights his way through Bowser's henchmen to rescue Princess Peach. Mario has access to several power-ups that help him complete his quest, including the Super Mushroom, the Fire Flower, and the Super Star, each giving him unique abilities. While traveling through eight worlds with more than 80 levels, Mario must defeat Bowser Jr. and Bowser before saving Princess Peach.

New Super Mario Bros. was commercially successful and received positive reviews; praise went towards the game's improvements made to the Mario franchise and faithfulness to older Mario games, while criticism was targeted at its low difficulty level and many critics noted its similarity to previous games. It sold over 30 million copies worldwide, making it the best-selling game for the Nintendo DS and one of the best-selling video games of all time. The game's success led to a line of sequels released for the Wii, Nintendo 3DS, Wii U, and Nintendo Switch.

Gameplay 

New Super Mario Bros. is a side-scrolling video game. While the game is seen in 2D, most of the characters and objects are 3D polygonal renderings on 2D backgrounds, resulting in a 2.5D effect that visually simulates 3D computer graphics. The player can play as either Mario, or his younger brother, Luigi. Similar to previous Mario games, Mario and Luigi can jump, crouch, collect coins, stomp on enemies, and break open blocks. Moves from 3D Mario games reappear in New Super Mario Bros., including the ground pound, triple jump, and wall jump. Enemies from previous games, such as Boos, are also reintroduced.

Between eight and twelve levels are available in each of eight worlds in New Super Mario Bros., which are shown on the Nintendo DS's bottom touch screen while the player is viewing the world map in the game. The map of the currently selected world appears on the top screen, which is used to navigate between the world's levels. The goal of each level is to reach a black flag at the end of the level. At the end of each world, a boss must be defeated before proceeding to the next world. There are six power-ups available in New Super Mario Bros.; the game allows the player to store an extra power-up when he is already using one, a feature carried over from Super Mario World. Three power-ups from Super Mario Bros. return in the game: the Super Mushroom makes Mario grow in size, the Fire Flower lets Mario throw fireballs, and the Starman makes Mario temporarily invincible. Three more power-ups are introduced in New Super Mario Bros.: the Blue Koopa Shell lets Mario withdraw into a shell to protect himself and perform a "shell dash" attack. He also swims faster when in this form. The Mega Mushroom grows Mario to an incredible size, where he can destroy everything in his path, and the Mini-Mushroom causes Mario to shrink, allowing him to enter tiny passageways. Mini Mario is so light that he can run on water and jump extremely high.

The multiplayer mode in New Super Mario Bros. features two players against each other as they play as Mario and Luigi in one of five stages, in which they try to be the first to obtain a preset number of stars. Both players can attack each other in attempts to steal the other player's stars. Jumping on the opponent's character will make them lose one star while performing a ground pound will lose them three. In addition, some minigames previously available in Super Mario 64 DS have returned and now offer multiplayer options for added replay value. The minigames are divided into four categories: Action, Puzzle, Table and Variety. New Super Mario Bros. features eighteen minigames for single players and ten minigames for multiple players.

Plot 
Mario and Princess Peach are walking together when lightning suddenly strikes Peach's Castle nearby. As Mario runs to investigate, Bowser Jr. appears, sneaking up on the princess from behind and kidnapping her. Realizing what has happened, Mario quickly rushes back and gives chase. Mario ventures through eight worlds pursuing Bowser Jr. and trying to rescue the captured princess. Mario catches up to them and confronts Bowser Jr. occasionally, but is unable to save the princess from his clutches. At the end of the first world, Bowser Jr. retreats to a castle, where his father, Bowser, awaits Mario on a bridge over a pit filled with lava. During a moment highly reminiscent of Super Mario Bros., Mario activates a button behind Bowser to defeat him, and the bridge underneath Bowser collapses, causing him to fall into the lava which burns his flesh, leaving a skeleton.

Though Bowser was defeated in the first world, this does not stop Bowser Jr. from running through the remaining worlds with Peach in tow, forcing Mario to chase after him before reaching Bowser's castle in World 8. There, Bowser Jr. revives his father's skeleton, creating Dry Bowser, but Mario once again defeats Bowser by dropping him into a deep pit. In the final battle, Bowser Jr. flees once more across a lava chasm to a larger castle, where he throws his father's bones into a cauldron and revives Bowser in his original form. They attack Mario in tandem, but Mario drops the pair into the pit below. In the game's final sequence, Mario rescues Peach, who kisses him on the cheek. Over the end credits, Bowser Jr. is seen dragging his unconscious father across the floor. He looks at the screen, and growls, breaking the fourth wall.

Development 
Nintendo announced on February 21, 2006, that New Super Mario Bros. would launch for the Nintendo DS on May 7, 2006. The game's new power-ups were also introduced at the same time, including the Blue Koopa Shell and the Mega Mushroom. Nintendo further mentioned that the game would be played in 2D, but use 3D models to create a 2.5D look and feel. The May 7 release was later delayed towards May 21, 2006, but the game's release date was eventually only pushed back slightly to May 15 of that year; Nintendo also planned to release the game around the same time that the Nintendo DS Lite launched, on June 11, 2006.

New Super Mario Bros. is the first original 2D platform game to feature Mario since Super Mario Land 2: 6 Golden Coins in 1992. New Super Mario Bros. was available for play at E3 in 2005. The game's designers were given much more freedom with designs in New Super Mario Bros. compared to previous 2D Mario games. Characters, enemies, and objects could now be created with much more detailed animations, without requiring that they would be designed by hand. To provide visual cues, the developers made the game's camera more dynamic; it zooms in and out of action depending on the situation to provide focus where necessary.

Physics play an important role in New Super Mario Bros. improved game mechanics. Without the rigid restrictions of tile-based sprites and backgrounds, the designers were free to explore new gameplay mechanics. When Mario lands on top of a tree, it teeters over and eventually falls if he is stationary for too long. Mario can also swing on ropes and walk on wires that bend and stretch under his weight.

Early in the game's development, the developers planned not to use voice acting for the game to stay true to the spirit of Super Mario Bros.; however, voice acting was eventually embraced by the developers, who decided that it would serve the game in a positive manner. Although voice acting was used in earlier 2D Mario remakes, New Super Mario Bros. is the first original 2D Mario game to use voice acting. Charles Martinet returned to voice Mario and Luigi, along with Nicole Mills as Princess Peach and Dolores Rogers as Bowser Jr. New Super Mario Bros. features original music composed by Asuka Ohta and Hajime Wakai under the direction of the Super Mario Bros. series composer, Koji Kondo, who also created the "Aboveground BGM", the main theme for regular levels. The game's music dictates gameplay; enemies jump and dance in time to the music. Predicting enemy movements, players can time their jumps with enemy movements to reach otherwise inaccessible areas.

Reception 

New Super Mario Bros. was released by Nintendo in North America on May 15, 2006, in Japan on May 25, 2006, and in Europe on June 30, 2006. Nintendo did not specify why it chose to delay the game's release in its home market of Japan by ten days, but GameSpot noted that "it stands to reason that the company simply wants a few more days to build inventory." In Japan, over 480,000 units of New Super Mario Bros. were sold on the day it was released and 900,000 copies in the first four days. At the time, it was the best-selling debut for a Nintendo DS game in Japan, but it has since been surpassed by Pokémon Diamond and Pearl. It is Japan's 26th best-selling game in 2008. In the United States, 500,000 copies of New Super Mario Bros. were sold in the first 35 days, and one million copies were sold twelve weeks after its release. Worldwide sales have steadily increased throughout the years, with five million copies by April 2008, eighteen million by March 2009, and 30.8 million by March 2016, making it the best-selling game for the Nintendo DS and one of the best-selling video games of all time.

The game received positive reviews from critics, with several calling New Super Mario Bros. one of the best games available for the Nintendo DS. GameZone believed that it was the "hot game" to purchase for any DS owner, noting its "huge exploration potential" and reinvention of the platform game genre. Tom Bramwell of Eurogamer stated, "I've done this sort of thing before hundreds of times across thousands of days in what feels like a dozen Mario games. I still love it." Believing that experienced players would require very little time to complete the game, GameSpot nevertheless considered New Super Mario Bros. a "completely awesome" game that was an "absolutely necessary" video game to own. GamesRadar considered the game a bargain, noting that it included "a completely solid solo game, a simple-but-exciting two-player, and then a collection of super-quick stylus games".

Several reviewers drew comparisons between New Super Mario Bros. and their favorite Mario games. Although some found that other Mario games were better, most reviewers were still pleased with the overall experience of the game. Some fans, however, criticized the game for its low difficulty compared to other Mario games. Craig Harris of IGN was enthused with New Super Mario Bros., stating that it was possibly his new favorite platform game, supplanting his previous, Super Mario World 2: Yoshi's Island. Even though Super Mario World and Super Mario Bros. 3 were considered the best 2D Mario games by GamePro'''s Mr. Marbles, he decided to add New Super Mario Bros. as his third favorite Mario game, which he admitted had much more replay value than the other two. Though the game includes new features such as a versus mode, Game Revolution disconcertedly asked the question, "Can Mario ever truly be new again?". It also disappointed Greg Sewart of X-Play, who found that the game did not live up to the standards set by its predecessors, but still considered the game the best side-scrolling video game available for the Nintendo DS.New Super Mario Bros.s graphics and audio received praise in a number of reviews. The Computer and Video Games magazine was entertained by the "finely crafted slice of Mario", along with the extra minigames offered. They believed that the audio was very good for a Nintendo DS game, predicting that "it'd still scare the pants off the hard-of-hearing." Though New Super Mario Bros. is a 2D game, GameSpy still found that the 2D and 3D elements blended together perfectly in the game. The game's overall experience pleased 1UP.com, which applauded Nintendo's ability to once again create an enjoyable, solid, and challenging portable experience. However, they were disappointed in the lack of imagination for this remake.New Super Mario Bros. received numerous awards and accolades. It was given Game of the Month awards from Game Informer and Electronic Gaming Monthly, and it received Editors' Choice Awards from IGN and GameSpot. The game was voted Best Handheld Game at the 2006 Spike Video Game Awards, Best Nintendo DS Game by GameSpot, and it won Best Platformer awards from X-Play and Nintendo Power. The game was awarded Choice Video Game at the 2006 Teen Choice Awards, and Nintendo Game of the Year at the 2006 Golden Joystick Award. In 2009, Official Nintendo Magazine remarked "Sure, it's a little easy at times and a bit short but with genius new power-ups and loads of retro nods, few games put a bigger smile on your face," placing the game 30th on a list of greatest Nintendo games.

 Sequels New Super Mario Bros. Wii, a successor to New Super Mario Bros., was released internationally for the Wii on November 12, 2009. It features similar gameplay to its predecessor, with several of the same power-ups returning as well as brand-new ones. The game is the first Super Mario game to feature cooperative gameplay for up to four people. A direct sequel, New Super Mario Bros. 2 was released for the Nintendo 3DS on July 28, 2012. New Super Mario Bros. U was released as a launch title for the Wii U on November 18, 2012. An expansion to the game titled New Super Luigi U was released as DLC on June 20th, 2013, but was later rereleased as its own disc. An enhanced version of New Super Mario Bros. U, including New Super Luigi U, was released for the Nintendo Switch on January 11, 2019 under the name of New Super Mario Bros. U Deluxe''. It features Toadette as a new playable character, replacing blue Toad in both games.

Notes

References

External links 

2006 video games
Multiplayer and single-player video games
Nintendo DS games
Nintendo DS-only games
Nintendo Entertainment Analysis and Development games
Side-scrolling video games
Video games about size change
Video games with 2.5D graphics
Video games developed in Japan
Video game reboots
Super Mario